Parlay Games Inc. is a Canadian-based developer of online bingo software founded by Perry Malone and Scott White.  Their bingo software is used since 1998. The company also licenses other games in the areas of Casino, Social Gaming and Class II. 

In 2011 the company sold the majority of its assets to M Projects Assets S.A. ("MProjects").

References

Online gambling companies of Canada
Bingo